Creighton University Observatory was located on the Creighton University campus in Omaha, Nebraska, United States.  It was the first observatory in Omaha, and the second in Nebraska.  It was used primarily for the instruction of students, though the directors did do some research in the observatory.  The observatory was demolished in late April of 2022 to allow for the construction of a new Jesuit residence hall.

Quick facts
 Construction began: October 6, 1885
 Benefactor: John A. Creighton
 Telescope mounted: May 6, 1886
 First telescope: 1884 J. H. Steward & Co. of London, 5" aperture, 84" focal length
 First light: August 22, 1886
 Directors:
 Father Joseph F. Rigge, S.J. (1883–1894)
 Father Charles J. Borgmeyer (1894–1895)
 Father William F. Rigge, S.J. (1895–1927)
 Father William Doyle, S.J. (1927–1930)
Demolished: April 25, 2022

History
As part of his endowment to found Creighton University, John A. Creighton donated the money for a telescope made by J.H. Steward & Co. of London.

Telescope statistics
 Aperture – 5 inches
 Focal length – 84 inches
 Mount – equatorial, on a brass column on an oak tripod with three large casters
 Mounting gear – driving clock, graduated circles, clamps and fine adjustment screws on both axes
 Eyepieces – 7 total (1 terrestrial, 1 diagonal, 5 astronomical)
 Initial storage – in the chemistry laboratory, rolled out as needed
 Cost – £125 (approximately US$625)
 Usage intent – popular and educational use

Observatory built
Father Joseph F. Rigge, S.J. arrived at Creighton in August 1885.  Assuming responsibility for the telescope, he noted that the constant movement of rolling the telescope in and out of its storage space did not allow for accurate usage and was even damaging the telescope. He suggested a small shed with a removable roof.  Father Dowling, the university president, was able to secure $1200 from Mr. Creighton for building a proper observatory.

Observatory statistics
 Ground broken – October 6, 1885
 Building completion – December 17, 1885
 Telescope mounted – May 6, 1886
 Pier composition – stone
 Central pier depth – 6 feet
 Central pier height from floor – 6 feet
 Circumference of dome room – 15 feet

Observatory demolition
As a result of the construction of a new Jesuit residence alongside 24th Street, the observatory was demolished. Portions of the observatory are being repurposed for a memorial.

Resources
 Memoirs of Father William Rigge, S.J.

See also
 List of astronomical observatories

References

External links
 Creighton University

Creighton University
Landmarks in Omaha, Nebraska
Astronomical observatories in Nebraska
Buildings and structures in Omaha, Nebraska
Defunct astronomical observatories